Michael Patrick "Mike" O'Leary (February 5, 1892 – September 12, 1954) was a Canadian professional ice hockey player. He played with the Toronto Blueshirts of the National Hockey Association, the Halifax Socials of the Maritime Professional Hockey Association, and the Victoria Aristocrats of the Pacific Coast Hockey Association. He died after an illness at his Ottawa home in 1954.

During the 1919–20 season O'Leary played centre for the Calgary Wanderers of the Big-4 League in Alberta.

Mickey O'Leary's older brother Eddie was a longtime referee in the National Hockey League.

References

Notes

External links
Mickey O'Leary at JustSportsStats

1892 births
1954 deaths
Canadian ice hockey centres
Ice hockey people from Ottawa
Toronto Blueshirts players
Victoria Aristocrats players